Dicky Angel Gonzalez Vallenilla (born December 21, 1978) is a former professional baseball pitcher. He played in Major League Baseball (MLB) for the New York Mets and Tampa Bay Rays and in Nippon Professional Baseball for the Tokyo Yakult Swallows, Yomiuri Giants, and Chiba Lotte Marines.

Career
Gonzalez was drafted by the New York Mets in the 16th round of the 1996 Major League Baseball draft. He played part of the  season for the Mets.  Prior to the 2002 season, he was traded with Bruce Chen, Luis Figueroa, and a player to be named later (Saúl Rivera) to the Montreal Expos for Phil Seibel, Scott Strickland and Matt Watson. Prior to the 2003 season, he was selected off waivers by the Boston Red Sox.

He was released on June 7, 2004.

He played in the 2006 World Baseball Classic for Puerto Rico.

After the 2008 season with the Swallows which saw him make only eight starts (1-5, 4.30), he was released.  The Giants signed Gonzalez to a one-year, 30 million yen contract in the offseason.  Gonzalez ended up having a career year in 2009, as he set career highs pretty much across the board.  In 23 starts, he finished with 15 wins against two losses in 162 innings pitched, recorded a 2.11 ERA, and had two complete games.  He started two games in the 2009 Japan Series against the Hokkaido Nippon Ham Fighters, winning one and receiving a no-decision in the other.

See also
 List of Major League Baseball players from Puerto Rico

References

External links

1978 births
Living people
Binghamton Mets players
Capital City Bombers players
Chiba Lotte Marines players
Durham Bulls players
Gigantes de Carolina players
Gulf Coast Mets players
Kingsport Mets players
Major League Baseball pitchers
Major League Baseball players from Puerto Rico
New York Mets players
Nippon Professional Baseball pitchers
Norfolk Tides players
Ottawa Lynx players
Pawtucket Red Sox players
Puerto Rican expatriate baseball players in Canada
Puerto Rican expatriate baseball players in Japan
St. Lucie Mets players
Tampa Bay Devil Rays players
Tokyo Yakult Swallows players
Yakult Swallows players
Yomiuri Giants players
2006 World Baseball Classic players